Amna Mufti (Punjabi) is a screenwriter, columnist, and novelist from Pakistan. She writes novels and television serials in Urdu-language. She has written several television serials for Satellite Entertainment Network. She won Lux Style Award for Best TV Writer in 2014 for her drama serial Ullu Baraye Farokht Nahi.

Notable work

Publications and novels
Jurrat-e-Rindana (جرآت رندانہ)
Ullu Baraye Farokht Nahi (الو براۓ فروخت نہیں)
Aakhri Zaman (آخری زمانہ)
Pani Mar Raha Hai (پانی مر رہا ہے)
Yeh Bhi Aik Kahani Hai (یہ بھی ایک کہانی ہے)

Television

Film
Khaemae Mein Matt Jhankain

Awards and achievements

Lux Style Awards

References

Living people
Pakistani screenwriters
Pakistani novelists
Pakistani women novelists
Lux Style Award winners
Punjabi people
Year of birth missing (living people)